Anwar Hossain (6 December 1931 – 13 September 2013) was a Bangladeshi actor, best known for playing the role of Siraj ud-Daulah in the Bengali film  Nawab Sirajuddaula (1967). He appeared in nearly 500 movies in his 50-year career. He received the Bangladesh National Film Award for Best Actor for his role in the film Lathial (1975) and Best Supporting Actor awards for the films again for Golapi Ekhon Traine (1978) and Dayi Ke? (1987).

Early life
Hossain was born in Jamalpur, as the third child of Nazir Hossain and Shadiya Khatun.

Career
Hossain started his film career  through Tomar Amar, released in 1958. His notable Urdu language films include  Nachghor, Bahana and Ujala. In 1965, Rupban brought him to fame, but he got his breakthrough with his lead role in Nawab Sirajuddaula in 1967.

Filmography

Awards
National Film Awards

 Bangladesh Film Journalist Association Award (Bachsas Awards) in 1979
 Chalachitra Darshak Forum in 2006
 Channel-I Film Mela Award in 2009

Death
Hossain was admitted to hospital in August 2013 for suspected gallstones. Doctors ruled surgery would be too invasive. Bangladeshi Prime Minister Sheikh Hasina visited him in hospital shortly before his death and issued his family with a cheque for one million Taka, equivalent to approximately eleven thousand US dollars. He died the following day, on 13 September 2013.

References

External links
 

1931 births
2013 deaths
Bangladeshi male film actors
Bangladeshi male stage actors
Recipients of the Ekushey Padak
Burials at Mirpur Martyred Intellectual Graveyard
Nigar Award winners
National Film Award (Bangladesh) for Lifetime Achievement recipients
Best Actor National Film Award (Bangladesh) winners
Best Supporting Actor National Film Award (Bangladesh) winners